The Ellan Vannin Football Team is a football team that represents the Isle of Man. It is not affiliated with FIFA or UEFA, and therefore cannot compete for the FIFA World Cup or in the UEFA European Championship.

Unlike the Isle of Man official football team which selects players who play in for clubs in the Manx league regardless of nationality, the Ellan Vannin team selects those of Manx nationality no matter where they are based.

They competed first at the ConIFA World Football Cup in 2014, where they won their group and became runners-up to the County of Nice.

History

Formation and early games
Formed in 2013, the Ellan Vannin team was created by the newly formed Manx International Football Alliance (MIFA) in order to enter ConIFA and compete at the ConIFA World Football Cup. As opposed to the official Isle of Man team (run by the Isle of Man FA), which is composed entirely of Isle of Man Football League players – regardless of nationality, Ellan Vannin will allow only those with Manx ties to play for them, in line with FIFA eligibility rules.

Following the signing of a memorandum of understanding between the MIFA and Isle of Man FA, intended to set out a working relationship between the two organisations, the MIFA announced that the first international to be played by Ellan Vannin would be a home game against Monaco on 6 April 2014, to be played at The Bowl in Douglas. Ellan Vannin won their first international 10–0.

Entry into ConIFA and 2014 ConIFA World Cup

Ellan Vannin were invited to participate in the first ConIFA World Football Cup in Sápmi, in 2014. Despite being a previously unknown quantity, they reached the final of the inaugural tournament, losing on penalties to County of Nice despite winning 4–2 over them in the Group Stage thanks to a Calum Morrissey hattrick.

2015 ConIFA European Cup and 2016 ConIFA World Cup

While the Isle of Man were originally set to host the 2015 ConIFA European Football Cup in June 2015, logistical problems eventually led to the tournament being moved to Székely Land. Here, despite defeat to Padania in the Group Stage, they still achieved a semi-final place where they were again defeated by County of Nice. A penalty win over Felvidék in the play-off saw them finish third. The next year, Ellan Vannin were set to appear in the 2016 ConIFA World Football Cup, but withdrew after being advised by the British Home Office not to travel to Abkhazia, where the tournament was to be held.

2017 European Football Cup, 2018 World Football Cup and Expulsion

The team returned to ConIFA activity in 2017 for the 2017 ConIFA European Football Cup in Northern Cyprus, finishing 6th. However, the team qualified for the 2018 ConIFA World Football Cup to be held in London (hosted by Barawa). In late 2017 it was announced that they would become the first opponents of the new Yorkshire national football team on January 28, 2018. After Yorkshire's membership to ConIFA was confirmed at the beginning of January, it meant that it would become an officially sanctioned friendly that would provide qualification points for future competitions. In May that year they took part in the 2018 ConIFA World Football Cup in London. However, after being knocked out by Barawa in the group stage, the MIFA protested at their opponents' alleged use of an ineligible player. After the other competing clubs voted to reject their appeal, Ellan Vannin withdrew from the tournament, and following a number of accusations made by the MIFA on social media against ConIFA, they were provisionally expelled from the organisation on 7 June 2018. Ellan Vannin were reinstated as full members at ConIFA's 2019 AGM in January 2019.

Fixtures and Results

2014

2015

2017

2018

Personalities of Ellan Vannin's football team

Squad
The following players were called up to the 22 man squad for the 2018 ConIFA World Football Cup to commence on 31 May 2018. Caps and goals correct as of 3 June 2018 after the game against .

Recent callups

Managers

Presidents of the  Manx International Football Alliance

Competitive Record

ConIFA World Cup

ConIFA European Cup

Notes

References

External links 

CONIFA member associations
European national and official selection-teams not affiliated to FIFA
Football in the Isle of Man
Sports teams in the Isle of Man
2013 establishments in the Isle of Man
Sports organizations established in 2013